1-Tridecanol is an alcohol with the formula C13H27OH. It is a colorless fatty alcohol that turns white when solid. 1-Tridecanol usually occurs as a mixture of different isomeric to compounds such as 2-tridecanol, 3-tridecanol, 4-tridecanol, 5-tridecanol, 6-tridecanol, and isotridecanol.

Use 
1-Tridecanol is used as a lubricant and for the manufacture of surfactants and plasticizers.

References

External links 
 Antibacterial Activity of Long-Chain Fatty Alcohols (PDF-Datei; 99 KB)

Fatty alcohols
Primary alcohols
Food emulsifiers
Cosmetics chemicals
Alkanols